Moraxella caviae is a Gram-negative bacterium in the genus Moraxella, which was isolated from the pharyngeal region and mouth of guinea pig.

References

External links
Type strain of Moraxella caviae at BacDive -  the Bacterial Diversity Metadatabase

Moraxellaceae
Bacteria described in 1968